Magdalena Lilly Eriksson (also Ericsson, born 8 September 1993) is a Swedish professional footballer who plays as a defender for Chelsea Women in the English Women's Super League as well as for the Swedish national team. A left-back and centre-back, she used to play for Hammarby IF, Djurgårdens IF and Linköpings FC in the Swedish Damallsvenskan. In November 2020, she was  awarded the Diamantbollen award.

Eriksson, like her partner Pernille Harder, is also known for her LGBTQ+ advocacy and LGBTQ+ rights in sport.

Club career
Eriksson began her football career with local team Enskede IK, but was encouraged by her father to join Hammarby IF in order to improve her game. Aged 17, she broke into Hammarby's first team in the 2011 Damallsvenskan season and made her debut against Umeå IK.

In November 2011, Eriksson left relegated Hammarby for their Stockholm rivals Djurgården. After scoring one goal in 19 appearances in the 2012 Damallsvenskan, she left Djurgårdens, who were facing relegation, for Linköpings FC.

In July 2017, after almost five years with Linköpings FC, she signed a two-year contract with Women's Super League team Chelsea Ladies. On 20 August 2018, she extended her contract until 2021. On 6 September 2019, Chelsea announced that Eriksson would be the new captain. On 12 November 2020, she extended her contract until 2023. On 9 December 2020, Eriksson made her 100th appearance for Chelsea in a Champions League win over Benfica.

For her performance over the years, and especially after Chelsea's WSL title winning 2020–21 season, Eriksson was hailed as one of the best defenders in Europe.

International career
As a Swedish under-19 international, Eriksson was part of the victorious squad at the 2012 U-19 European Championship. In November 2013, national team coach Pia Sundhage called her to a senior squad training camp at Bosön. Eriksson made her debut for the senior Sweden team in a 3–0 friendly defeat by France in Amiens on 8 February 2014. She was part of the Swedish squad that won silver at the 2016 Summer Olympics. Since then, Eriksson has represented Sweden at every major tournament, namely UEFA Women's Euro 2017, 2019 FIFA Women's World Cup, 2020 Summer Olympics, and UEFA Women's Euro 2022. At the 2020 Olympics, she won the silver medal after Sweden lost to Canada in the final after penalties.

Personal life
Eriksson's mother is of Finnish descent. She is openly lesbian and, since May 2014, in a relationship with current Chelsea teammate and Danish international Pernille Harder. She and Harder work with the charity Common Goal and pledged 1% of their salaries to help tackle social issues throughout football. The couple also both push for equality and LGBTQ+ rights in sport.

During her upbringing, she assumed her last name was spelled with a C because that was how her father spelled it. When she was 17 and looked in her passport she realised it was actually spelled with a K. As such, her last name is often misspelled as "Ericsson" rather than the correct "Eriksson".

Eriksson has a bachelor's degree in political science and took a course in feminist theory and intersectional power analysis.

Career statistics

Club

International
Scores and results list Sweden's goal tally first, score column indicates score after each Eriksson goal.

Honours
Linköpings FC
Damallsvenskan: 2016
Svenska Cupen: 2013–14, 2014–15; runner-up: 2015–16	
Svenska Supercupen: runner-up: 2015, 2016

Chelsea
FA Women's Super League: 2017–18, 2019–20, 2020–21, 2021–22
Women's FA Cup: 2017–18, 2020–21, 2021–22
FA Women's League Cup: 2019–20, 2020–21
FA Community Shield: 2020

Sweden U19
UEFA Women's Under-19 Championship: 2012

Sweden
Summer Olympic Games Silver medal: 2016, 2020
FIFA Women's World Cup Third place: 2019

Individual
 Diamantbollen: 2020
 Fotbollsgalan: Swedish Defender of the Year: 2020, 2021
 FIFA FIFPro World XI: 2021

References

External links

Magdalena Eriksson at SvFF 

1993 births
Living people
Footballers from Stockholm
Swedish women's footballers
Sweden women's international footballers
Women's association football defenders
Swedish expatriate women's footballers
Swedish expatriate sportspeople in England
Expatriate women's footballers in England
Enskede IK players
Hammarby Fotboll (women) players
Djurgårdens IF Fotboll (women) players
Linköpings FC players
Chelsea F.C. Women players
Damallsvenskan players
Women's Super League players
Olympic footballers of Sweden
Olympic silver medalists for Sweden
Olympic medalists in football
Footballers at the 2016 Summer Olympics
Medalists at the 2016 Summer Olympics
UEFA Women's Euro 2017 players
2019 FIFA Women's World Cup players
Footballers at the 2020 Summer Olympics
Medalists at the 2020 Summer Olympics
UEFA Women's Euro 2022 players
Swedish LGBT rights activists
Swedish LGBT sportspeople
Lesbian sportswomen
LGBT association football players